Al-Shibr is a village in Yemen, located in the region known as Upper Yafa (Arabic: يافع العليا  Yāfiʿ al-ʿUlyā). Prior to the revolt of 1963 this region was a sultanate that consisted of five sheikdoms. Al-Shibr was the capital of the Hadrami Sheikhdom and its Sheikh has his headquartered there.

Populated places in Yemen